Originals is the self-titled debut album by West Coast gangsta rap group Originals, led by Kurupt and CJ Ginavece. It was released on March 30, 2004.

Track listing

References

Kurupt albums
2005 compilation albums
Gangsta rap compilation albums